Julen Bollain Urbieta (born 28 March 1990) is a Spanish economist, politician and researcher, specialized in unconditional basic income. He was elected to the Basque Parliament in the 2016 Basque parliamentary election as a candidate of the newly formed coalition Elkarrekin Podemos.

Biography 

Bollain was born in Eibar on 28 March 1990. He comes from a middle-class family, which has historically been related to Eibar's industry.

Academic career 

Bollain did his bachelor's degree in Business administration and Management at the University of the Basque Country in Bilbao and at the University of Saint Louis, Brussels. After completing his degree, he earned a master's degree in International Management and International Relations at Oxford Brookes University (England).

The year after finishing his stay in Oxford, he obtained the Goethe-Zertifikat of German by the Goethe Institute, speaking fluently Basque, Spanish, English, French and German.

He is currently doing a PhD program in Development Studies about unconditional basic income under the direction of Daniel Raventós.

Bollain is a board member of the Red Renta Básica and a lifetime member of the Basic Income Earth Network (BIEN). He gives talks, trainings and attends both national and international conferences and congresses. Bollain also writes frequently articles (mostly in the republican and socialist journal Sin Permiso) and teaches in the postgraduate program in Analysis of Capitalism and Transformative Policies, interuniversity studies between the University of Barcelona and the Autonomous University of Barcelona.

Professional career 

Once finished the master's degree and thus ending his stay in Oxford in September 2013, Bollain began his professional career in a private enterprise. He worked for two years as export area manager in the Metallurgical sector.

Political trajectory 

Bollain took part in the 15-M Movement first in Spain and afterwards in Belgium. He participated in the assemblies held in Bilbao in 2011, and welcomed in Brussels the Marches to Brussels on 8 October 2011.

He has been taking part in Podemos from the beginning and was elected General Secretary of Podemos in Eibar on 2 January 2015 after being voted by the militancy with the 55% of the votes.

Bollain was presented to the autonomous elections of the Basque Country in 2016 by Elkarrekin Podemos, obtaining the act of parliamentary on 21 October 2016. He became the youngest parliamentary of the XI legislature.

He is currently the economic spokesman of the coalition and the chairman of the Health Commission of the Basque Parliament.

Articles and Interviews (selection)

Lan Harremanak (Labour Relations Journal) 
 La Renta Básica Incondicional ante las limitaciones de las Rentas Mínimas 21 December 2018

REVES (Basque Journal of Social Economics)
 Renta Básica Incondicional y Economía Social: un intento de relación. 26 February 2016

Books 
 A Variety of Experiments. In: The Palgrave International Handbook of Basic Income (pp. 407–435). 28 September 2019

Green European Foundation (European Green Perspectives on Basic Income) 

 How Basic Income Can Make up for What Minimum Income Schemes Lack. February 2019

Sin Permiso
 Alarmante aumento del número de personas en situación de pobreza grave en Euskadi. 19 July 2019
 Una propuesta para principios del siglo XXI: La Renta Básica en el Parlamento Vasco. 9 March 2019
 "La renta básica se entiende como un camino hacia la libertad". 1 October 2018
 Crónica sobre el XVIII Congreso de la Basic Income Earth Network (BIEN) 2 September 2018
 Avanzando en la medición del paro real en el País Vasco 1 July 2018
 “El estrepitoso fracaso del proyecto finlandés de Renta Básica.” ¿Cómo manipular la realidad? 27 April 2018
 Por una vida digna: de la calle a las instituciones 25 February 2018
 El XVII simposio de la Red Renta Básica: ¿punto de inflexión? 12 November 2017
 La Renta Básica Incondicional ha venido para quedarse en Podemos Euskadi. 29 October 2017
 La Renta Básica ya ha amarrado en Finlandia. Siguiente destino: Barcelona. 6 September 2017
 La Renta Básica y la vagancia de ciertos mitos. 25 June 2017
 La Renta Básica Incondicional: viable y justa. 9 June 2017
 Esclarecimiento del neoliberalismo vasco para dummies. 9 April 2017
 Renta Básica: un video precioso, una campaña fantástica. 25 January 2017
 En Euskadi se puede y se debe garantizar la existencia a toda la cuidadanía. 27 January 2017
 Es la hora de la gente: es la hora de la Renta Básica Incondicional. 5 January 2017
 Otra encuesta sobre la renta básica incondicional… y ya son tres. 4 November 2016
 «La renta básica incondicional aumentaría la libertad de gran parte de la población» 9 October 2016
 La renta básica incondicional irrumpe en las elecciones vascas. 18 September 2016
 Por qué quizá no está tan lejos como pensamos la Renta Básica del Reino de España. 19 August 2016
 «Una de las falacias sobre la Renta Básica es que desincentivaría al trabajador». 27 July 2016

Público
Las prioridades de la triple alianza neoliberal. 4 April 2017
Una Renta Básica Incondicional que nos permita avanzar en el siglo XXI. 23 January 2020

Dissertation 

 Under the direction of Professor Duncan Angwin, «Does transfer of knowledge differ depending on the type of subsidiary? A focus on production and sales oriented subsidiaries». 27 September 2013

References 

1990 births
Living people
21st-century Spanish politicians
Alumni of Oxford Brookes University
Podemos (Spanish political party) politicians